Neist Point Lighthouse is a lighthouse located on Neist Point on the Isle of Skye in Scotland. It was designed by David Alan Stevenson and was first lit on 1 November 1909. An aerial cableway is used to take supplies to the lighthouse and cottages.

Since 1990, the lighthouse has been operated remotely from the Northern Lighthouse Board headquarters in Edinburgh. The former keepers' cottages are now in private ownership.

In 1971 the lighthouse was listed as a Category B listed building.<ref></hi

See also

 List of lighthouses in Scotland
 List of Northern Lighthouse Board lighthouses

References

External links

 Northern Lighthouse Board

Lighthouses completed in 1909
Lighthouses in the Isle of Skye
Category B listed buildings in Highland (council area)
Category B listed lighthouses

de:Neist Point#Leuchtturm